Hawaii was admitted to the Union on August 21, 1959, and elects U.S. senators to Classes 1 and 3. Seven people including only one Republican have served as a U.S. senator from Hawaii. The state's current U.S. senators are Democrats Brian Schatz and Mazie Hirono. Hawaii's Class 1 seat is the only one in the United States that has always been held by an ethnic minority. Its Class 3 seat is the only one in the United States that has always been held by a member of the Democratic Party. 

Hawaii last elected a Republican in 1970, which has resulted in the longest streak in the nation for a state's having all-Democratic senators. Daniel K. Inouye was Hawaii's longest-serving senator, from 1963 to 2012.

List of senators

|- style="height:2em"
! rowspan=9 | 1
| rowspan=9 align=left nowrap | Hiram Fong
| rowspan=9  | Republican
| rowspan=9 nowrap | Aug 21, 1959 –Jan 3, 1977
| rowspan=3 | Elected in 1959.
| rowspan=3 | 1
| 
| rowspan=2 | 1
| rowspan=2 | Elected in 1959.Retired.
| rowspan=2 nowrap | Aug 21, 1959 –Jan 3, 1963
| rowspan=2  | Democratic
| rowspan=2 align=right nowrap | Oren E. Long
! rowspan=2 | 1

|- style="height:2em"
| 

|- style="height:2em"
| 
| rowspan=3 | 2
| rowspan=3 | Elected in 1962.
| rowspan=27 nowrap | Jan 3, 1963 –Dec 17, 2012
| rowspan=27  | Democratic
| rowspan=27 align=right nowrap | Daniel Inouye
! rowspan=27 | 2

|- style="height:2em"
| rowspan=3 | Re-elected in 1964.
| rowspan=3 | 2
| 

|- style="height:2em"
| 

|- style="height:2em"
| 
| rowspan=3 | 3
| rowspan=3 | Re-elected in 1968.

|- style="height:2em"
| rowspan=3 | Re-elected in 1970.Retired.
| rowspan=3 | 3
| 

|- style="height:2em"
| 

|- style="height:2em"
| 
| rowspan=3 | 4
| rowspan=3 | Re-elected in 1974.

|- style="height:2em"
! rowspan=7 | 2
| rowspan=7 align=left nowrap | Spark Matsunaga
| rowspan=7  | Democratic
| rowspan=7 nowrap | Jan 3, 1977 –Apr 15, 1990
| rowspan=3 | Elected in 1976.
| rowspan=3 | 4
| 

|- style="height:2em"
| 

|- style="height:2em"
| 
| rowspan=3 | 5
| rowspan=3 | Re-elected in 1980.

|- style="height:2em"
| rowspan=3 | Re-elected in 1982.
| rowspan=3 | 5
| 

|- style="height:2em"
| 

|- style="height:2em"
| 
| rowspan=5 | 6
| rowspan=5 | Re-elected in 1986.

|- style="height:2em"
| Re-elected in 1988.Died.
| rowspan=5 | 6
| rowspan=3 

|- style="height:2em"
| colspan=3 | Vacant
| Apr 15, 1990 –May 16, 1990
|  

|- style="height:2em"
! rowspan=14 | 3
| rowspan=14 align=left nowrap | Daniel Akaka
| rowspan=14  | Democratic
| rowspan=14 nowrap | May 16, 1990 –Jan 3, 2013
| rowspan=3 | Appointed to continue Matsunaga's term.Elected in 1990 to finish Matsunaga's term.

|- style="height:2em"
| 

|- style="height:2em"
| 
| rowspan=3 | 7
| rowspan=3 | Re-elected in 1992.

|- style="height:2em"
| rowspan=3 | Re-elected in 1994.
| rowspan=3 | 7
| 

|- style="height:2em"
| 

|- style="height:2em"
| 
| rowspan=3 | 8
| rowspan=3 | Re-elected in 1998.

|- style="height:2em"
| rowspan=3 | Re-elected in 2000.
| rowspan=3 | 8
| 

|- style="height:2em"
| 

|- style="height:2em"
| 
| rowspan=3 | 9
| rowspan=3 | Re-elected in 2004.

|- style="height:2em"
| rowspan=5 | Re-elected in 2006.Retired.
| rowspan=5 | 9
| 

|- style="height:2em"
| 

|- style="height:2em"
| rowspan=3 
| rowspan=5 | 10
| Re-elected in 2010.Died.

|- style="height:2em"
|  
| nowrap | Dec 17, 2012 –Dec 26, 2012
| colspan=3 | Vacant

|- style="height:2em"
| rowspan=3 | Appointed to continue Inouye's term.Elected in 2014 to finish Inouye's term.
| rowspan=9 nowrap | Dec 26, 2012 –present
| rowspan=9  | Democratic
| rowspan=9 align=right nowrap | Brian Schatz
! rowspan=9 | 3

|- style="height:2em"
! rowspan=6 | 4
| rowspan=6 align=left nowrap | Mazie Hirono
| rowspan=6  | Democratic
| rowspan=6 nowrap | Jan 3, 2013 –present
| rowspan=3 | Elected in 2012.
| rowspan=3 | 10
| 

|- style="height:2em"
| 

|- style="height:2em"
| 
| rowspan=3 | 11
| rowspan=3 | Re-elected in 2016.

|- style="height:2em"
| rowspan=3 | Re-elected in 2018.
| rowspan=3 | 11
| 

|- style="height:2em"
| 

|- style="height:2em"
| 
| rowspan=3 | 12
| rowspan=3 | Re-elected in 2022.

|- style="height:2em"
| rowspan=3 colspan=5 | To be determined in the 2024 election.
| rowspan=3 | 12
| 

|- style="height:2em"
| 

|- style="height:2em"
| 
| 13
| colspan=5 | To be determined in the 2028 election.

See also

 List of United States representatives from Hawaii
 United States congressional delegations from Hawaii
 Elections in Hawaii

External links
 Members of Congress from Hawaii, govtrack.us
 U.S. Senate members from Hawaii, civil.services

 
United States senators
Hawaii